Herina aartseni is a species of picture-winged fly in the genus Herina of the family Ulidiidae.

References

Ulidiidae
Insects described in 2002
Diptera of Europe